Nicholas Matthew Eddy (born August 23, 1944) is a former American football player.  He was raised in Tracy, California.  A broad-shouldered 6 feet, 195 lbs, he attended the University of Notre Dame on a football scholarship. Eddy was a standout running back and kick returner.  Eddy was an All-American halfback, leading Notre Dame to the 1966 national championship. He finished third to Steve Spurrier and Bob Griese in the 1966 Heisman Trophy balloting.  The Detroit Lions drafted Eddy in the 1966 NFL Draft.  Eddy played for the Lions from 1967 to 1972, although he was never a star. He was hampered by knee injuries.

Eddy appeared as himself in the George Plimpton movie, Paper Lion. Eddy and his spouse and family live in Modesto, California.

Eddy obtained a Mild Moderate Specialist teaching credential from Chapman University in Modesto in 2005.  He currently teaches special education for Modesto City Schools.  Eric C. Hansen devotes a chapter to Eddy in his book, Notre Dame: Where Have You Gone (2005).

References

External links
 Stats

1944 births
Living people
American football running backs
Detroit Lions players
Notre Dame Fighting Irish football players
All-American college football players
Chapman University alumni
People from Dunsmuir, California
People from Tracy, California
Players of American football from California